Trevor John Siemian (born December 26, 1991) is an American football quarterback who is a free agent. He played college football at Northwestern and was drafted by the Denver Broncos in the seventh round of the 2015 NFL Draft. Siemian was a part of the 2015 Broncos team that won Super Bowl 50. He has also played for the Minnesota Vikings, New York Jets, Tennessee Titans, New Orleans Saints, and Chicago Bears.

Early years and education
Siemian was born on December 26, 1991 in Danbury, Connecticut to Walter and Colleen Siemian. 

Siemian attended Olympia High School in Orlando, Florida. On the football team, he threw for an Orange County record of 6,144 career yards and 53 touchdowns as quarterback for three seasons with the Titans. He was also an outstanding baseball shortstop, third baseman, and outfielder, was voted Mr. Olympia by his classmates during his senior year. He graduated with a 3.9 GPA and was named to the National Honor Society. 

Siemian chose to attend Northwestern University.

College career
At Northwestern University, Siemian majored in Communication Studies and was awarded Academic All-Big Ten Conference honors in 2013 and 2014. He redshirted during his freshman year of college in 2010.

2011 season
In 2011, Siemian was a backup quarterback to main starter Dan Persa. He played in eight games, the first against Eastern Illinois. He completed 16 of 26 passes for 256 yards and three touchdowns for the year.

2012 season
In the 2012 season, Siemian earned a majority of the quarterback reps while Kain Colter saw occasional playing time. In the season-opener against Syracuse, Siemian led the team on a 75-yard game-winning drive after being down by six with 2:40 to play. Against Vanderbilt, he led back-to-back go-ahead drives in the fourth quarter, including a key 34-yard completion on a third-and-15 play. He made his first career start in a game against Indiana, throwing for 308 yards on 22-of-32 passing in a 44–29 win. He led #21 Northwestern to a 34-20 TaxSlayer.com Gator Bowl victory versus Mississippi State, where he led two touchdown drives and scored his first career rushing touchdown.

2013 season
In 2013, Siemian played in all 12 games and made his second and third career starts, while playing behind "wildcat" quarterback Kain Colter. Against Illinois, he passed for 414 yards, which was the 10th-highest total by a Northwestern quarterback. He threw a career-high 46 times versus Minnesota, completing 25. Against Ohio State, he made a career-long pass of 67 yards. Facing Syracuse, he threw a career-high three touchdown passes. Against California, he rushed for a career-high 21 yards. The Wildcats finished with a 5–7 record and missed out on a bowl game. For the year, he threw for 2,149 yards and 11 touchdowns. He ranked sixth in the Big Ten for completion percentage (59.7), seventh for yards per completion (12.07), and ninth in total offense (181.8).

2014 season
In 2014, Siemian started the first 11 games before having a season-ending knee injury, a torn anterior cruciate ligament,) at Purdue on November 22. Versus Notre Dame, he passed for a season-high 284 yards and ran for a career-high 32 yards in a 43–40 overtime win. Against both Michigan and Minnesota, he posted a career high in completions (32). Facing Penn State, he ran for a career-high three touchdowns. Against California, he threw a 54-yard touchdown and caught a 17-yard touchdown pass. The Wildcats once again finished with a 5–7 record and missed out on a bowl game. For the year, he rushed for five touchdowns and passed for 2,214 yards. The latter ranks him just outside of the top 10 in Northwestern single-season history.

Even though he started only 14 career games, Siemian completed college ranked fourth all-time at Northwestern in career passing yardage (5,931), fourth in completions (550), sixth in offensive yards (5,908), and seventh in passing touchdowns (27).

College statistics

Professional career

Denver Broncos

2015 season

Siemian was rated the 22nd best quarterback in the 2015 NFL Draft by NFLDraftScout.com. Anticipating that he would not be drafted, Siemian lined up a commercial real estate job in Chicago. However, he was drafted in the 7th round with the 250th pick (overall) of the 2015 NFL Draft by the Denver Broncos. He was the seventh and final quarterback to be taken in the draft.

Siemian made his NFL debut in the 2015 season against the Pittsburgh Steelers on December 20, 2015, taking a knee to close out the first half. On February 7, 2016, Siemian was part of the Broncos team that won Super Bowl 50 over the Carolina Panthers by a score of 24–10. He was inactive for the game.

2016 season
In the 2016 season, following Peyton Manning's retirement and Brock Osweiler signing with the Houston Texans, it opened up a competition for the Broncos starting quarterback job between Siemian, veteran Mark Sanchez, and rookie Paxton Lynch. On August 29, Broncos head coach Gary Kubiak named Siemian the starting quarterback for the 2016 season.

Against the Carolina Panthers in the 2016 regular season opener and Super Bowl 50 rematch, Siemian completed 18-of-26 passes for 178 yards, one touchdown, and two interceptions in his first NFL start and 21–20 victory. He was the first quarterback in NFL history to start the season opener for the defending Super Bowl champion without having thrown an NFL pass. He was the first Northwestern quarterback since Randy Dean in 1979 to start an NFL game. 

The following week, Siemian threw for 266 yards in a 34–20 win over the Indianapolis Colts; 215 of those yards came in the first half.

On September 25, 2016, Siemian became the first quarterback in NFL history to throw 300 yards and complete 4 touchdowns with no interceptions in his first career road start in a 29–17 win over the Cincinnati Bengals. His 132.1 quarterback rating was the highest achieved in the league that week. He was named the AFC Offensive Player of the Week for his performance against the Bengals.

During Week 12 in a Sunday Night Football game against the Kansas City Chiefs, Siemian threw three touchdowns with no interceptions on 20-of-34 passing for 368 yards. Although the Broncos ultimately lost 30-27 in overtime, he achieved a quarterback rating of 125.6, the second-best of his career to date when playing in the majority of a game.

From Weeks 8 to 14, Siemian was one of only three quarterbacks who averaged over 300 passing yards per game (the other two were Tom Brady and Kirk Cousins). By Week 16, he averaged 300.2 passing yards in his previous six games.

Although the Broncos finished the season with a 9–7 record and missed the playoffs, Siemian compiled an 18-10 touchdown-to-interception ratio and an 84.6 passer rating. On both measures, Siemian significantly outperformed the Broncos' Peyton Manning-Brock Osweiler quarterback duo of 2015.

On January 23, 2017, Siemian was named as an alternate for the 2017 Pro Bowl, but declined the invitation due to recovery from left shoulder surgery two weeks prior.

2017 season
Going into the 2017 season, Siemian had a new head coach in Vance Joseph. Siemian and the Broncos opened the 2017 season against the Los Angeles Chargers on Monday Night Football. Siemian completed 17-of-28 passes for 219 yards, two touchdowns, and one interception as well as his first career rushing touchdown. The Broncos took a 24–7 lead, but two costly turnovers helped the Chargers make the score 24–21, but Broncos defensive end Shelby Harris blocked the Chargers attempt at a game-tying field goal from Younghoe Koo, giving the Broncos the win. 

The following week, Siemian and the Broncos hosted the Dallas Cowboys, led by 2016 Offensive Rookie of the Year Dak Prescott and 2016 leading rusher Ezekiel Elliott. The Broncos defense shut down Dallas' offense and Siemian went 22-of-32 for 231 yards, a career-high-tying four touchdowns, and one interception as the Broncos blew out the Cowboys 42–17. For his performance, Siemian was voted the NFL's Clutch Performer of the week and the FedEx Air Player of the week. 

During Week 6 against the New York Giants on NBC Sunday Night Football, Siemian briefly left the game with a left shoulder injury near the end of the second quarter. He came back in the game in the third quarter, but two interceptions and a fumble still proved to be costly as the Broncos lost by a score of 23–10, despite Siemian having a career-high 376 passing yards. 

On November 1, after a 29-19 loss against the Kansas City Chiefs which saw Siemian throw three interceptions, it was announced that Brock Osweiler would start the team's Week 9 game against the Philadelphia Eagles in place of Siemian. 

In a Week 12 matchup against the Oakland Raiders, Siemian entered the game in the third quarter in relief of an injured Paxton Lynch.  Trailing 21-0, Siemian nearly rallied the Broncos to a win, but the Broncos lost 21-14. Siemian finished 11-of-21 for 149 yards and two touchdown passes. A day after the game, it was announced that Lynch would miss two to four weeks due to his injury, making Siemian the starter. 

In Week 15 on Thursday Night Football against the Indianapolis Colts, Siemian suffered a shoulder injury in the first quarter and did not return to the game. He was placed on injured reserve on December 15, 2017.

Minnesota Vikings
On March 19, 2018, Siemian, along with a 2018 seventh-round draft pick, was traded to the Minnesota Vikings in exchange for a 2019 fifth-round draft pick.

He saw no playing time backing up Kirk Cousins in the 2018 season.

New York Jets
On March 20, 2019, Siemian signed a one year, $2 million deal with the New York Jets. 

On September 12, 2019, quarterback Sam Darnold was ruled out indefinitely with mononucleosis, and Siemian was named the starter against the Cleveland Browns on Monday Night Football in Week 2. Siemian suffered an ankle injury on a late hit by Myles Garrett and left the game after completing 3 of 6 passes for three yards, and was replaced by third-string quarterback Luke Falk. The next day, it was revealed that there were torn ligaments in his ankle, prematurely ending his season.

After becoming a free agent in March 2020, Siemian had a tryout with the Detroit Lions on August 14, 2020.

Tennessee Titans
On August 19, 2020, Siemian was signed by the Tennessee Titans to backup starter Ryan Tannehill on a one-year deal. On September 5, 2020, Siemian was released by the Titans and re-signed to the practice squad the next day.

New Orleans Saints
On November 20, 2020, the New Orleans Saints signed Siemian to their active roster off the Titans' practice squad after an injury to starting quarterback Drew Brees. The Saints waived Siemian on December 19, 2020, and signed him to their practice squad three days later. On January 18, 2021, Siemian signed a reserve/futures contract with the Saints.

On August 31, 2021, Siemian was released by the Saints and re-signed a week later. 

Siemian made his Saints debut during the 2021 season in a Week 8 against the Tampa Bay Buccaneers after starter Jameis Winston left the game with a torn ACL.  Siemian threw for 159 yards and a touchdown leading the Saints to a 36–27 win. 

The next week he was named the starter against the Atlanta Falcons over Taysom Hill who had recently cleared concussion protocol. Siemian was named the team's starter for the next four games, all Saints losses, after which he was benched in favor of Hill.

Siemian finished the 2021 season (six games played, four as the starter) with 1,154 yards, 11 touchdowns, three interception, 57.4% completion percentage, and with a career-high 88.4 passer rating.

Chicago Bears
On March 29, 2022, Siemian signed a two-year contract with the Chicago Bears. Siemian made his Bears debut in a 29-49 loss to Dallas Cowboys going 1/1 for 5 yards.

After Justin Fields suffered an injury in the Week 11, Siemian was given his first start as a Bear in Week 12 against his former team, the New York Jets. Siemian suffered an oblique injury during pregame warmups. The Bears initially announced their third-string quarterback, Nathan Peterman, would start the game, but Siemian still made the start. He completed 14 of 25 passes for 179 yards, while throwing a touchdown and an interception in a 31–10 loss.

On December 3, Siemian was placed on injured reserve to undergo season-ending surgery to repair his oblique injury.

Siemian was released on March 16, 2023 after the Bears signed P. J. Walker.

NFL career statistics

Regular season

References

External links

Northwestern Wildcats bio

1991 births
Living people
American football quarterbacks
Chicago Bears players
Denver Broncos players
Minnesota Vikings players
New Orleans Saints players
New York Jets players
Northwestern Wildcats football players
People from Windermere, Florida
Players of American football from Connecticut
Players of American football from Florida
Sportspeople from Danbury, Connecticut
Sportspeople from Orange County, Florida
Tennessee Titans players